(translating to "anchovy drippings") is an Italian fish sauce made from anchovies, from the small fishing village of Cetara, Campania. The sauce is a transparent, amber-colored liquid, produced by fermenting salted anchovies inside terzigni, small chestnut barrels. The fish used in the sauce are harvested from the Amalfi Coast between March 25 (Annunciation) and July 22 (Feast of Mary Magdalene).

History 

The origins of colatura di alici date back to ancient Rome, where a similar sauce known as garum was widely used as a condiment. The recipe for garum was recovered by a group of Medieval monks, who would salt anchovies in wooden barrels every August, allowing the fish sauce to drip away through the cracks of the barrels over the course of the process. Eventually the process spread across the region and was perfected by using wool sheets to filter the fish sauce. One common way this fish sauce has been used is in a dish called spaghetti alla colatura di alici, which includes small amounts of the fish sauce with spaghetti, garlic, and olive oil.

See also

References

Fish sauces
Italian sauces
Cuisine of Campania
Anchovy dishes